The city of Vancouver, along with the rest of British Columbia's municipalities, held its municipal elections on November 19, 2005. Canadian citizens who were over 18 years of age at the time of the vote, and had been a resident of Vancouver for the past 30 days and a resident of BC for the past six months, were able to vote for candidates in four races that were presented on one ballot. In addition, Canadian citizen non-resident property owners were eligible to vote.

The ballot elects one mayor, 10 councillors, nine school board trustees and seven park board commissioners. Each elector may vote for as many candidates as there are open seats (e.g., an elector may vote for ten or fewer councillors).

Elections to City Council

Overall council results
All figures include votes cast for both mayor and councillors

Mayoral election
One to be elected.

Councillor election
Ten to be elected.

Elections to the Park Board
Seven to be elected.

Elections to the School Board
Nine to be elected.

See also
 2008 Vancouver municipal election

References

External links
 City of Vancouver elections site
 Profiles of all candidates
 Buday, Gölök Zoltán on Our Campaigns
 Green, James C (Carl) on Our Campaigns
 Politics1 Canada (Beta) includes Some Candidate Info
 Vancouver Charter 
 Vancouver School Board (School District #39) 
 Vancouver Board of Parks and Recreation
 UBC Media Map of entire news coverage
 Electoral Fraud Comes to Vancouver One view of the controversy surrounding the Jim/James Green Issue
 City website enlightens voter about long list of colourful candidates
 Vancouver Votes by Sean Condon ; Only Magazine; 2005
 Sing Tao Article On 2005 Election
 CFIB, Independent Business Survey. (PDF)
 The Vancouverite: The City Is Voting In 13 Days
 Vancouver Ramblings.
 Wannabe mayors talk sports and recreation By Bob Mackin
 Man of God, flower shop owner, linebacker walk into an election... By Mike Howell-Staff writer
 Kitsilano Forum
 Ian King (TCW News Editor); Wrote The Now Broken Linked Article in the TCW "It Ain't Being Indy
 Think City Vancouver Survey Results (PDF)
 Think City
 Who will you cast your vote for? Q

2005 elections in Canada
Municipal elections in Vancouver
2005 in British Columbia